Kaleeth is a village panchayat located in the Jammu district in the union territory of Jammu and Kashmir, India. Located  from Jammu, Kaleeth is located in the foothills of the Himalayas. It is also part of proposed Jammu–Poonch line.

Geography
Kaleeth is located about 18 km far from Akhnoor. It is a hilly region which falls under chambh sector. It lies near to the border of Pakistan. The border of Pakistan can clearly be seen from the height of this place. Kaleeth also have ancient temples, mosques, and a churches. Mainly it was known as a strategic advantage point to be used in war because of the Fort that was made there and was awarded to Colonel Shiv Ram Singh along with the nearby forest land  by the Ruler of Riyasat of Jammu and Kashmir.

References

Villages in Jammu district